Trimerorhachidae is a family of dvinosaurian temnospondyls, including Trimerorhachis and Neldasaurus.

They are vertebrates and carnivores.

Gallery

References

Dvinosaurs
Amphibian families